is a railway station on the Muroran Main Line in Oshamambe, Hokkaido, Japan, operated by the Hokkaido Railway Company (JR Hokkaido).

Lines
Shizukari Station is served by the Muroran Main Line, and is numbered "H46".

History
The station opened on 10 December 1923. With the privatization of Japanese National Railways (JNR) on 1 April 1987, the station came under the control of JR Hokkaido.

See also
 List of railway stations in Japan

Railway stations in Hokkaido Prefecture
Railway stations in Japan opened in 1923